The 1774–75 papal conclave (October 5 – February 15), was convoked after the death of Pope Clement XIV and ended with the election of Cardinal Giovanni Angelo Braschi, who took the name of Pius VI.

Death of Clement XIV

Pope Clement XIV died suddenly on September 22, 1774, at the age of 68. His pontificate had been dominated by the problem of the Society of Jesus. The various courts under the House of Bourbon and the Kingdom of Portugal (under the House of Braganza) urged the general suppression of the order. The pope tried to defend Jesuits and to temporize, but finally had to capitulate, and in 1773 he issued the Brief Dominus ac Redemptor which suppressed the Society of Jesus. Father Lorenzo Ricci, general of the order, had been imprisoned in the Castel Sant'Angelo. However, the Jesuits still had many adherents in the Roman Curia and in the Sacred College of Cardinals. The attitude toward Jesuits remained the main criterion of the appreciation of the candidates to the papal succession in the subsequent conclave.

The death of a pope frequently presented an opportunity for the citizens of Rome to vent their anti-clerical feelings, often in the context of satires, sometimes salacious, directed at either the late pope or the cardinals. In 1774, the Governor of Rome had occasion to ban a drama entitled the Conclave for offending the "dignity, decorum, and venerable representation of the Sacred College, as well as, other persons as subjects."

List of participants
At the death of Clement XIV there were fifty-five cardinals in the Sacred College, but two of them died during sede vacante, while another nine remained entirely absent. Forty-four cardinals participated in the conclave:

Gian Francesco Albani (created cardinal on April 10, 1747) — Cardinal-Bishop of Porto e Santa Rufina; Dean of the Sacred College of Cardinals; prefect of the S.C. of Ceremonies; Cardinal-protector of the Kingdom of Poland
Henry Benedict Stuart (July 3, 1747) — Cardinal-Bishop of Frascati; commendatario of S. Lorenzo in Damaso; Sub-dean of the Sacred College of Cardinals; Vice-Chancellor of the Holy Roman Church; archpriest of the patriarchal Vatican Basilica
Fabrizio Serbelloni (November 26, 1753) — Cardinal-Bishop of Ostia e Velletri
Carlo Rezzonico (September 11, 1758) — Cardinal-Bishop of Sabina; commendatario of S. Marco; Camerlengo of the Holy Roman Church
François-Joachim de Pierre de Bernis (October 2, 1758) — Cardinal-Bishop of Albano; Cardinal-protector and ambassador of the Kingdom of France before the Holy See; administrator of the see of Albi
Carlo Vittorio Amedeo delle Lanze (April 10, 1747) — Cardinal-Priest of S. Prassede
 Vincenzo Malvezzi (November 26, 1753) — Cardinal-Priest of SS. Marcellino e Pietro; archbishop of Bologna; Pro-Datary of His Holiness
 Antonio Sersale (April 22, 1754) — Cardinal-Priest of S. Pudenziana; archbishop of Naples
 Francisco de Solís Folch de Cardona (April 5, 1756) — Cardinal-Priest of SS. XII Apostoli; archbishop of Seville; Cardinal-protector of the Kingdom of Spain
Paul d'Albert de Luynes (April 5, 1756) — Cardinal-Priest of S. Tommaso in Parione; archbishop of Sens
 Girolamo Spinola (September 24, 1759) — Cardinal-Priest of S. Balbina
 Giuseppe Maria Castelli (September 24, 1759) — Cardinal-Priest of S. Alessio; prefect of the S.C. for the Propagation of Faith
 Gaetano Fantuzzi (September 24, 1759) — Cardinal-Priest of S. Pietro in Vincoli; prefect of the S.C. of the Ecclesiestical Immunities
Marcantonio Colonna (September 24, 1759) — Cardinal-Priest of S. Maria della Pace; Vicar General of Rome; prefect of the S.C. of the Residence of Bishops; archpriest of the patriarchal Liberian Basilica
Andrea Corsini (September 24, 1759) — Cardinal-Priest of S. Mateo in Via Merulana; prefect of the Supreme Tribunal of the Apostolic Signature of Justice
Christoph Anton von Migazzi von Waal und Sonnenthurn (November 23, 1761) — Cardinal-Priest [no title assigned]; archbishop of Vienna; administrator of the see of Vác
Simon Buonaccorsi (July 18, 1763) — Cardinal-Priest of S. Giovanni a Porta Latina
Giovanni Ottavio Bufalini (July 21, 1766) — Cardinal-Priest of S. Maria degli Angeli; archbishop of Ancona
Giovanni Carlo Boschi (July 21, 1766) — Cardinal-Priest of SS. Giovanni e Paolo; Grand penitentiary; prefect of the Congregation for the correction of the books of the Oriental Church
Ludovico Calini (September 26, 1766) — Cardinal-Priest of S. Stefano al Monte Celio; prefect of the S.C. of the Indulgences and the Sacred Relics; Camerlengo of the Sacred College of Cardinals
Antonio Colonna Branciforte (September 26, 1766) — Cardinal-Priest of S. Maria in Via; legate in Bologna
Lazzaro Opizio Pallavicino (September 26, 1766) — Cardinal-Priest of SS. Nereo ed Achilleo; Cardinal Secretary of State
Vitaliano Borromeo (September 26, 1766) — Cardinal-Priest of S. Maria in Aracoeli; legate in Romagna
Pietro Pamphli (September 26, 1766) — Cardinal-Priest of S. Maria in Trastevere
Urbano Paracciani Rutili (September 26, 1766) — Cardinal-Priest of S. Callisto; archbishop of Fermo
Mario Marefoschi Compagnoni (January 29, 1770) — Cardinal-Priest of S. Agostino; prefect of the S.C. of Rites; archpriest of the patriarchal Lateran Basilica
Scipione Borghese (September 10, 1770) — Cardinal-Priest of S. Maria sopra Minerva; legate in Ferrara; Cardinal-protector of Germany
Antonio Eugenio Visconti (June 17, 1771) — Cardinal-Priest of [no title assigned]
Bernardino Giraud (June 17, 1771) — Cardinal-Priest of SS. Trinita al Monte Pincio; archbishop of Ferrara
Innocenzo Conti (September 23, 1771) — Cardinal-Priest [no title assigned]
Gennaro Antonio de Simone (March 15, 1773) — Cardinal-Priest of S. Bernardo alle Terme
Francesco Carafa di Traetto (April 19, 1773) — Cardinal-Priest of S. Clemente
Francesco Saverio de Zelada (April 19, 1773) — Cardinal-Priest of S. Martino ai Monti
Giovanni Angelo Braschi (April 26, 1773) — Cardinal-Priest of S. Onofrio; commendatory abbot of Subiaco
Alessandro Albani (July 16, 1721) — Cardinal-Deacon of S. Maria in Via Lata; commendatario of S. Maria in Cosmedin; protodeacon of the Sacred College of Cardinals; Librarian of the Holy Roman Church; Cardinal-protector of Austria and Kingdom of Sardinia
Domenico Orsini d'Aragona (September 9, 1743) — Cardinal-Deacon of S. Maria ad Martyres; Cardinal-protector of the Kingdom of Naples
Luigi Maria Torregiani (November 26, 1753) — Cardinal-Deacon of S. Agata in Suburra
Giovanni Costanzio Caracciolo (September 24, 1759) — Cardinal-Deacon of S. Eustachio; prefect of the Apostolic Tribunal of the Signature of Grace
Andrea Negroni (July 18, 1763) — Cardinal-Deacon of SS. Vito e Modesto; secretary of the Apostolic Briefs
Benedetto Veterani (September 26, 1766) — Cardinal-Deacon of SS. Cosma e Damiano; prefect of the S.C. of Index
Giovanni Battista Rezzonico (September 10, 1770) — Cardinal-Deacon of S. Nicola in Carcere Tulliano
Antonio Casali (December 12, 1770) — Cardinal-Deacon of S. Giorgio in Velabro; prefect of the S.C. of Good Government
Pasquale Acquaviva d'Aragona (December 12, 1770) — Cardinal-Deacon of S. Maria in Aquiro; pro-president of Urbino
Francesco D'Elci (April 26, 1773) — Cardinal-Deacon of S. Angelo in Pescheria

Thirteen cardinals were created by Clement XIV, twenty by Clement XIII, ten by Pope Benedict XIV and one (Alessandro Albani) by Innocent XIII.

Absentees

Nine cardinals were absent:

Giuseppe Pozzobonelli (September 9, 1743) – Cardinal-Priest of S. Lorenzo in Lucina; protopriest of the Sacred College of Cardinals; archbishop of Milan
Franz Konrad Casimir von Rodt (April 5, 1756) – Cardinal-Priest of S. Maria del Popolo; bishop of Constance
Francisco de Saldanha da Gama (April 5, 1756) – Cardinal-Deacon [no deaconry assigned]; patriarch of Lisbon
Buenaventura de Córdoba Espínola de la Cerda (November 23, 1761) – Cardinal-Priest of S. Lorenzo in Panisperna; patriarch of the West Indies; Vicar General of the Spanish Army and Fleet
Jean-François-Joseph Rochechouart (November 23, 1761) – Cardinal-Priest of S. Eusebio; bishop of Laon
Louis-César-Constantine de Rohan-Guéménée (November 23, 1761) – Cardinal-Priest [no title assigned]; bishop of Strasbourg
João Cosme da Cunha, C.R.S.A. (August 6, 1770) – Cardinal-Priest [no title assigned]; archbishop of Evora; Inquisitor General of the Portuguese Inquisition
Charles-Antoine de La Roche-Aymon (December 16, 1771) – Cardinal-Priest [no title assigned]; archbishop of Reims
Leopold Ernest von Firmian (December 14, 1772) – Cardinal-Priest [no title assigned]; bishop of Passau

Benedict XIV, Clement XIII and Clement XIV created three of them each.

Died during sede vacante

Two cardinals, including one created by Benedict XIV and one created by Clement XIII:

Giovanni Francesco Stoppani (November 26, 1753) – Cardinal-Bishop of Palestrina; Secretary of the Supreme S.C. of the Roman and Universal Inquisition (died on November 18, 1774, at Rome)
Ferdinando Maria de' Rossi (September 24, 1759) – Cardinal-Priest of S. Cecilia; prefect of the S.C. of the Tridentine Council (died on February 4, 1775, at Rome)

Divisions in the Sacred College
The College of Cardinals was generally divided into two blocs: curial, pro-Jesuit (zelanti) and political, anti-Jesuit. The first one was formed by the Italian curial cardinals who opposed the secular influences on the Church. The second one included crown-cardinals of the Catholic courts. These two blocs were in no way homogenous. Zelanti were divided into moderate and radical factions. The anti-Jesuit bloc was divided into several national groups with different interests.

The leader of Zelanti was Cardinal Marcantonio Colonna. The other representatives of this faction were Giovanni Battista Rezzonico, his relative Carlo Rezzonico, who occupied the important office of the camerlengo of the Holy Roman Church, Gian Francesco Albani, dean of the College of Cardinals, and Alessandro Albani, archdeacon of the College. The Rezzonichi represented the radical wing of this faction, while the Albanis and Colonna represented the moderate wing. Among the anti-Jesuit cardinals the main leader was Cardinal de Bernis, ambassador of Louis XVI of France. The interests of Charles III of Spain were represented by Cardona, interests of Ferdinand III of Sicily/Ferdinand IV of Naples by Orsini, while those of Maria Theresa of Austria and her son Joseph II, Holy Roman Emperor were under the care of Migazzi and Corsini. Also very influential was Cardinal Giraud, former nuncio in France. Several cardinals were not counted among the members of these factions.

There was no main favourite of the conclave. About thirty cardinals were considered papabile.

Conclave
The conclave began on October 5, 1774. Initially there were only 28 participants. By the middle of December their number reached only 39, but by the end of the conclave five more cardinals arrived.

Cardinal Marcantonio Colonna, taking advantage of the small number of electors, mostly curial cardinals belonging to his zelanti faction, tried to release Father Ricci from prison. This initiative obtained support of camerlengo Carlo Rezzonico and of Henry Benedict Stuart, but the anti-Jesuit faction was strong enough to frustrate it.

Every day at least one ballot took place, but no candidates with serious chances for the election were proposed at the beginning, because the number of electors was relatively small and they were obliged to await the arrival of the rest, particularly of those representatives of the courts who did not reside in Rome. Zelanti voted mainly for their leader Colonna, who received the greatest number of votes in these initial ballots, but certainly had no chances to secure the required majority of two thirds. Some other candidates were also put forward by the Zelanti, but they were all rejected by crown-cardinals as too pro-Jesuit. Against the candidature of Giovanni Carlo Boschi the Bourbon courts even pronounced the official papal veto.

Although the court factions cooperated by blocking of Zelanti candidates, they were unable to agree upon one of their own. Spain supported Pallavicino, while Austria favoured Visconti, a former nuncio at Vienna. Towards the end of 1774, the name of young Cardinal Giovanni Angelo Braschi was raised for the first time. Braschi belonged to the moderate wing of the Zelanti faction. He was advanced by Cardinal Giraud, and obtained a significant number of votes. The crown-cardinals rejected Braschi as pro-Jesuit, although Cardinal de Bernis in his report for the French court found him moderate man and did not exclude the support for him in the future, if no better candidate would be found. No consensus had been achieved before the end of 1774.

In January 1775 cardinals Migazzi, Borromeo, Caracciolo, Pallavicino and Visconti were proposed by the political factions, but without any significant success, because Zelanti rejected all candidates recommended by the monarchs. Cardinal Zelada tried to mediate between factions, proposing to reduce the number of candidates to six, of whom each of the two blocs had to advance three, and to elect the one who would be the most acceptable for all. But this initiative had also failed.

Gradually French Cardinals de Bernis and Luynes came to the conclusion that it was impossible to find any better candidate with chances for election than the initially rejected Cardinal Braschi. This was the turning point of the conclave. Braschi's candidacy gained important and influential allies. But Spain and Portugal still opposed him as too favorable toward the Jesuits. Braschi also had some opponents in the radical wing of his own party. To secure the required majority, Cardinal de Bernis aligned himself with Cardinal Zelada, who acted as mediator: de Bernis had to convince the political factions, while Zelada had to overcome the opposition among the radical Zelanti. Also Cardinal Albani was engaged in the promotion of Braschi.

Cardinal Zelada secured the support of Zelanti without serious problems. Spain's candidate, Pallavicino, openly declared that he would not accept the tiara and supported Braschi. The other political factions agreed when Braschi promised the ratification of the suppression of the Jesuits, his friendship to the House of Bourbon and to the House of Habsburg, and agreed to be guided by the allies in the distribution of State offices.

Election of Pius VI
On February 15, 1775, after 134 days of deliberation, on the 265th ballot, Cardinal Giovanni Angelo Braschi was elected to the papacy receiving all votes except his own, which, according to custom, he gave to Gian Francesco Albani, dean of the Sacred College of Cardinals. He took the name of Pius VI, in honour of St. Pius V.

On February 22, 1775, the Pope-elect was consecrated bishop of Rome by Cardinal Dean Gian Francesco Albani, bishop of Porto e Santa Rufina, assisted by Sub-dean Henry Benedict Stuart, bishop of Frascati, and Camerlengo Carlo Rezzonico, bishop of Sabina. On the same day he was also solemnly crowned by Cardinal Alessandro Albani, protodeacon of S. Maria in Via Lata.

Notes

Sources
Jean-François Bourgoing, Historical and Philosophical Memoirs of Pius the Sixth and of His Pontificate, 1799
S. Miranda: List of participants of the conclave, 1774–75
Damian Hungs: Papst Pius VI
Valérie Pirie The Triple Crown: An Account of the Papal Conclaves
Kazimierz Dopierała, Księga papieży, Pallotinum, Poznań 1996

1774 in the Papal States
1775 in the Papal States
Papal conclaves
1774 in politics
1775 in politics
18th-century Catholicism
1774 in Europe
1775 in Europe
1774 in Christianity
1775 in Christianity
18th-century elections in Europe